Hemphill may refer to:

Hemphill (surname)

Places
Hemphill Island a small, mainly ice-covered Antarctic island
Hemphill, Kentucky
Hemphill, Texas
Hemphill County, Texas

Title
Baron Hemphill, a title in the Peerage of the United Kingdom

Music
The Hemphills, former gospel music group originally from Bastrop, Louisiana